Lewington's Transport was a major Australian transport company owned and operated by the Lewington family.

In 1949 Jack Lewington founded the company with a single Leyland Comet 75 carting stock feed, phosphate and fuel. By 2000 the company had grown to a fleet of over 200 trucks (mainly Kenworth) operating across three divisions "general", "fuel" and "livestock".

Lewington's were at this time the largest livestock carrying business in Australia.

In 2004 the company began to experience financial difficulties due to a severe drought and a huge spike in the cost of fuel and subsequently the business was sold to Ron Finemore and rebranded as "Ron Finemore Transport".

Finemore's later sold the livestock division off to Stockmaster.

Barry and Geoff Lewington are still active in the transport industry, operating new ventures.

References

Logistics companies of Australia